Stiphodon discotorquatus is a species of goby found in French Polynesia.
  
This species can reach a length of  SL.

References

discotorquatus
Taxa named by Ronald E. Watson
Fish described in 1995